Prachantakham railway station is a railway station located in Prachantakham Subdistrict, Prachantakham District, Prachinburi Province.

References 

Railway stations in Thailand
Prachinburi province